Kensington (Māori: Tawatawhiti) is a suburb of Whangārei, in Northland Region, New Zealand. It is about 2 kilometres north of the city centre. State Highway 1 runs through Kensington, The Western Hills form a boundary on the west, and Hātea River on the east.

The area includes Whangarei Quarry Gardens, a 24 hectare public garden set around an artificial lake.

History

In 2018, Whangarei District Council completed improvements to the Kensington Avenue and Kamo Road intersection, following delays since 2014 in acquiring properties.

In April 2020, Police investigated the death of a five-month-old baby at a home in Kensington.

The following month, Police recovered a stolen vehicle with a baby inside from a property in Kensington. The vehicle had been stolen from a nearby petrol station before being abandoned.

A major storm struck Kensington in July 2018. It caused extensive damage to the Whangarei Quarry Gardens, and at least one home was evacuated.

In August 2020, the first stage of a $15.5 million development opened in Kensington. The complex includes a medical centre, gym, physio, food outlets and an early childhood centre. The property was owned by Northland Regional Council, and was previously the site of a Woolworths and Countdown supermarket, but had been vacant since 2014.

Demographics

Kensington had a population of 3,240 at the 2018 New Zealand census, an increase of 228 people (7.6%) since the 2013 census, and an increase of 39 people (1.2%) since the 2006 census. There were 1,389 households, comprising 1,527 males and 1,713 females, giving a sex ratio of 0.89 males per female. The median age was 46.4 years (compared with 37.4 years nationally), with 480 people (14.8%) aged under 15 years, 570 (17.6%) aged 15 to 29, 1,443 (44.5%) aged 30 to 64, and 747 (23.1%) aged 65 or older.

Ethnicities were 75.3% European/Pākehā, 27.4% Māori, 4.3% Pacific peoples, 8.2% Asian, and 1.5% other ethnicities. People may identify with more than one ethnicity.

The percentage of people born overseas was 19.7, compared with 27.1% nationally.

Although some people chose not to answer the census's question about religious affiliation, 45.1% had no religion, 41.0% were Christian, 2.4% had Māori religious beliefs, 1.6% were Hindu, 0.3% were Muslim, 0.9% were Buddhist and 2.0% had other religions.

Of those at least 15 years old, 486 (17.6%) people had a bachelor's or higher degree, and 588 (21.3%) people had no formal qualifications. The median income was $25,600, compared with $31,800 nationally. 321 people (11.6%) earned over $70,000 compared to 17.2% nationally. The employment status of those at least 15 was that 1,200 (43.5%) people were employed full-time, 378 (13.7%) were part-time, and 123 (4.5%) were unemployed.

References

Populated places in the Northland Region
Suburbs of Whangārei